Walter Marx (born 17 May 1978 in Poprad) is a Slovak luger who competed from 1993 to 2006. Competing in two Winter Olympics, he earned his best finish of ninth in the men's doubles event at Salt Lake City in 2002.

Marx carried the Slovak flag at the 2006 Winter Olympics Opening Ceremony.

Marx's best finish at the FIL World Luge Championships was seventh in the men's doubles event at Park City, Utah in 2005. He served as a technical delegate to the FIL World Luge Championships 2009 in Lake Placid, New York.

References
2002 luge men's doubles results
2006 luge men's doubles results
Eurosport.com report of all flag bearers for the opening ceremony of the 2006 Winter Olympics, including Marx
FIL-Luge profile
List of jury and technical delegates for the FIL World Luge Championships 2009 in Lake Placid, including Marx. - accessed 2 February 2009.
SSSR profile of the luge team, including Marx

External links
 

1978 births
Living people
Slovak male lugers
Olympic lugers of Slovakia
Lugers at the 2002 Winter Olympics
Lugers at the 2006 Winter Olympics
Sportspeople from Poprad